In biochemistry and molecular biology, a pulse-chase analysis is a method for examining a cellular process occurring over time by successively exposing the cells to a labeled compound (pulse) and then to the same compound in an unlabeled form (chase).

Mechanism
A selected cell or a group of cells is first exposed to a labeled compound (the pulse) that is to be incorporated into a molecule or system that is studied (also see pulse labeling). The compound then goes through the metabolic pathways and is used in the synthesis of the product studied. For example, a radioactively labeled form of leucine (3H-leucine) can be supplied to a group of pancreatic beta cells, which then uses this amino acid in insulin synthesis.

Shortly after introduction of the labeled compound (usually about 5 minutes, but the actual time needed is dependent on the object studied), excess of the same, but unlabeled, substance (the chase) is introduced into the environment. Following the previous example, the production of insulin would continue, but it would no longer contain the radioactive leucine introduced in the pulse phase and would not be visible using radioactive detection methods. However, the movement of the labeled insulin produced during the pulse period could still be tracked within the cell.

Uses
This method is useful for determining the activity of certain cells over a prolonged period of time. The method has been used to study protein kinase C, ubiquitin, and many other proteins. The method was also used to prove the existence and function of Okazaki fragments. George Palade used pulse-chase of radioactive amino acids to elucidate the secretory pathway.

References

Cell imaging